The Van Horn Hotel on N. 3rd St. in Bismarck, North Dakota, United States, was designed by architect Arthur W. Van Horn.  It was built in 1916.  It has also been known as the Prince Hotel.  It was listed on the National Register of Historic Places in 1984.

Notables who have stayed there include Shirley Temple, Eleanor Roosevelt, General George C. Marshall, and Roy Rogers and Dale Evans.

References

1916 establishments in North Dakota
Hotel buildings completed in 1916
Hotel buildings on the National Register of Historic Places in North Dakota
National Register of Historic Places in Bismarck, North Dakota